Coiled-coil domain containing 22 is a protein that in humans is encoded by the CCDC22 gene.

Function 

This gene encodes a protein containing a coiled-coil domain. The encoded protein functions in the regulation of NF-kB (nuclear factor kappa-light-chain-enhancer of activated B cells) by interacting with COMMD (copper metabolism Murr1 domain-containing) proteins. The mouse orthologous protein has been shown to bind copines, which are calcium-dependent, membrane-binding proteins that may function in calcium signaling. In humans, this gene has been identified as a novel candidate gene for syndromic X-linked intellectual disability.

Clinical significance 
Mutations in CCDC22 are associated with Ritscher-Schinzel syndrome.

References

External links

Further reading